Chaleh may refer to:

 Jenah, a city in Hormozgan Province, Iran
 Chaleh, Hamadan, a village in Hamadan province, Iran
 Chaleh, Bastak, a village in Hormozgan Province, Iran
 Chaleh-ye Faramarzan, a village in Hormozgan Province, Iran
 Chaleh, Faryab, a village in Kerman Province, Iran
 Chaleh, Rabor, a village in Kerman Province, Iran
 Chaleh, Khorramabad, a village in Lorestan Province, Iran
 Chaleh, Pol-e Dokhtar, a village in Lorestan Province, Iran
 Chaleh, Qazvin, a village in Qazvin Province, Iran

See also
 Chaleh is a common element in Iranian place names; see